Bahman Koohestani is a former executive at Netscape, and was the co-founder of the Toronto software company Delano. He had formerly run the messaging division at Netscape, and Delano was founded to create software to allow companies to easily transfer information between their back and front offices. Prior to his time at Netscape, Koohestani was the Senior Director and Chief Architect of Electronic Forms and Commerce at Delrina.  Koohestani has currently left Orbitz LLC.
In March 2002, Delano was bought by divine.

External links
"The CEO of Delano discusses E-business Interaction Suite, the company's platform for various e-business apps"
"Divine to acquire Delano Technology for 1.1 revenue"
"Delano Technology Corporation Receives Seed Funding and Announces Executive Team"

Koohestani, Bahman
Canadian company founders